The Royal Scottish National Orchestra (RSNO) is a Scottish orchestra, based in Glasgow. It is one of the five national performing arts companies of Scotland. Throughout its history, the Orchestra has played an essential part in Scotland’s musical life, including performing at the opening ceremony of the Scottish Parliament building in 2004.

Its music centre and rehearsal studios are directly connected to the Glasgow Royal Concert Hall. The RSNO performs throughout Scotland, at such venues as Glasgow Royal Concert Hall, Usher Hall, Caird Hall, Aberdeen Music Hall, Perth Concert Hall and Eden Court Theatre. Thomas Søndergård is the orchestra's current music director, since 2018.

History
The precursor ensemble to the RSNO was established in 1843 to accompany the Glasgow Choral Union (today known as the RSNO Chorus). In 1891, the orchestra was recognised formally as the Scottish Orchestra, with George Henschel as the ensemble's first principal conductor under that name. In 1950, the orchestra took the name of the Scottish National Orchestra. The orchestra received royal patronage in 1977, one of only three British orchestras to do so (after the Royal Philharmonic and Royal Liverpool Philharmonic).  It continued to use the name 'Scottish National Orchestra' until 1991, when it changed to its present name (although during 1992 it briefly changed to the title Royal Scottish Orchestra before reverting to its current name).

The orchestra's longest-serving principal conductor was Sir Alexander Gibson, the first Scot to be its  principal conductor and musical director, from 1959 to 1984, who is also the founder of Scottish Opera. He pioneered overseas tours by the Orchestra, the SNO Junior Chorus and by Scottish Opera. He also became Hon President of the Royal Conservatoire of Scotland. During Gibson's tenure, beginning in 1979, the RSNO's base was at Henry Wood Hall in Glasgow and this space was also used as its recording venue.  Gibson was particularly noted for his interpretations of Scandinavian composers, notably Jean Sibelius and Carl Nielsen.  His successor, Neeme Järvi, continued this tradition, and also led the orchestra through its first complete Gustav Mahler cycle.  Principal conductor from 1984 to 1988, Järvi currently has the title of conductor laureate with the RSNO. Bryden Thomson, the orchestra's second Scottish principal conductor, maintained the Nordic link with a cycle of Nielsen symphonies.

Alexander Lazarev was principal conductor of the RSNO from 1997 to 2005, and now has the title of conductor emeritus with the orchestra.  Marin Alsop was the RSNO's principal guest conductor from 2000 to 2003, the first woman to hold the title.  Garry Walker succeeded Alsop as principal guest conductor, serving from 2003 to 2007. Stéphane Denève was music director of the RSNO from 2005 to 2012. During his tenure, the RSNO recorded music of Debussy and of Albert Roussel, the latter for Naxos Records.

In January 2011, the RSNO announced the appointment of Peter Oundjian as its next music director, as of the 2012–2013 season, with an initial contract of 4 years. In October 2011, Thomas Søndergård was named the orchestra's principal guest conductor, as of the 2012–2013 season, with an initial contract of 3 years for 3 programmes per year.
In 2015, the orchestra took up new residence at the RSNO Centre and Glasgow Royal Concert Hall.  The RSNO's current assistant conductor is Holly Mathieson, since September 2016.  Oundjian is scheduled to conclude his tenure as RSNO music director after the close of the 2017–2018 season.

In May 2017, the RSNO announced the appointment of Søndergård as its next principal conductor, effective with the 2018-2019 season.  In June 2017, the RSNO appointed Elim Chan as its next principal guest conductor, effective 2018, following her first guest-conducting appearance with the RSNO in January 2017 and a return engagement a fortnight later as an emergency substitute for Neeme Järvi.  In February 2021, the RSNO announced the extension of Søndergård's contract as music director through autumn 2024.

In December 2018, the RSNO announced the appointment of Alistair Mackie as its next chief executive, effective April 2019.

RSNO Chorus and RSNO Junior Chorus
The affiliated choruses of the RSNO are the RSNO Chorus and the RSNO Junior Chorus. The RSNO Chorus evolved from a choir formed in 1843 to sing the first full performance of Handel's Messiah in Scotland, in April 1844.  In addition to its commitment to the RSNO, the Chorus performs independently and has toured worldwide. The current chorus director is Gregory Batsleer.

In 1978, Jean Kidd formed the RSNO Junior Chorus.  In 1994 its director became Christopher Bell and then in 2018 it changed to Patrick Barrett. The RSNO Junior Chorus has a membership of around 400 singers, aged from eight to eighteen.  The members learn to sing using the Kodály method.

Recordings

The orchestra has had a long-standing recording contract with Chandos Records, particularly in the 1980s and 1990s. The RSNO has also recorded for Naxos Records, most notably in a cycle of Anton Bruckner symphonies with Georg Tintner, cycles of Arnold Bax symphonies with David Lloyd-Jones, and several recordings of American works (including the complete orchestral works of Samuel Barber) conducted by Marin Alsop.  With Denève, their first Roussel recording received the Diapason d'Or de l'année for Symphonic Music.  The second disc in the series was released in 2008.

Principal conductors

 George Henschel (1893–1895)
 Willem Kes (1895–1898)
 Wilhelm Bruch (1898–1900)
 Frederic Cowen (1900–1910)
 Emil Młynarski (1910–1916)
 Landon Ronald (1919–1923)
 Václav Talich (1926–1927)
 Vladimir Golschmann (1928–1930)
 John Barbirolli (1933–1936)
 George Szell (1937–1939)
 Warwick Braithwaite (1940–1946)
 Walter Susskind (1946–1952)
 Karl Rankl (1952–1957)
 Hans Swarowsky (1957–1959)
 Alexander Gibson (1959–1984)
 Neeme Järvi (1984–1988)
 Bryden Thomson (1988–1990)
 Walter Weller (1992–1997)
 Alexander Lazarev (1997–2005)
 Stéphane Denève (2005–2012)
 Peter Oundjian (2012–2018)
 Thomas Søndergård (2018–present)

References

Sources
 Playing for Scotland: History of the Royal Scottish Orchestra; author Conrad Wilson, published by Collins, 1993.

External links
 Royal Scottish National Orchestra official website

1891 establishments in Scotland
Musical groups established in 1891
British symphony orchestras
Culture in Aberdeen
Culture in Dundee
Culture in Edinburgh
Music in Glasgow
Organisations based in Glasgow
National Orchestra
Scottish orchestras
National performing arts companies of Scotland
Scottish
Arts organizations established in 1891